Lyzza, stylized as LYZZA, is a Brazilian artist and DJ based in the Netherlands. As a teenager she enrolled in a DJ workshop class by Jarreau Vandal, who encouraged her to keep pursuing music. She started as a Ballroom DJ in Amsterdam and eventually started touring around the club scene in Europe. As an electronic pop artist, she released three EPs and a mixtape and has been associated with the avant-pop genre as well as "post-PC Music". 

Lyzza has cited Nicki Minaj's Pink Friday: Roman Reloaded (2012) as an influence, explaining how "Roman Reloaded taught me you don’t have to censor yourself, there’s not that many rules to the artistic creation of music." Lyzza has stated that she found her Soundcloud community with Ariel Zetina, Jasmine Infiniti, LSDXOXO, among others.

In 2022, Lyzza released her mixtape Mosquito on the label Big Dada, an imprint of Ninja Tune. The mixtape featured a collaboration with Spanish artist La Zowi.

References 

Avant-pop music
Year of birth missing (living people)
Living people
Brazilian artists
Brazilian dance musicians
Brazilian DJs